The Piano Sonata No. 3 in F minor, Op. 14, called "Concerto for piano without orchestra" by Tobias Haslinger, was composed by Robert Schumann in 1836 and dedicated to Ignaz Moscheles, to whom in a letter he comments "what crazy inspirations one can have". Liszt believed that the work was rich and powerful. In 1853 Schumann revised the work and added a Scherzo as a second movement, which the performer could choose to play, or not play. In 1861 it was released into the hands of his student Johannes Brahms.

Movements
 Allegro brillante (F minor)
Scherzo. Molto commodo (D-flat major)
 Quasi variazioni. Andantino de Clara Wieck (F minor)
Prestissimo possible (F minor, ends in F major)

The work, in general, is a typical sonata with some surprises such as Clara Schumann's andantino. The final movement is reminiscent of his Kreisleriana, Op. 16. This movement ends with a coda in F major concluding the work in a brilliant and powerful way. Many pianists such as Vladimir Horowitz, Grigory Sokolov, and Maurizio Pollini have interpreted it.

References

Sources

External links
 
  performed by Friedrich Wührer

Piano music by Robert Schumann
1836 compositions
Schumann 3
Compositions in F minor